The Symphony in F minor (originally referred to as the Fairy Tale Symphony;;), Op. 4, is a four-movement symphony for orchestra written from 1896 to 1897 by the precocious, 19-year old Finnish composer Ernst Mielck. The piece, reportedly inspired by Hans Christian Andersen's fairy tale the Ice Maiden, premiered in Helsinki on 20 October 1897, with Robert Kajanus conducting the Helsinki Orchestral Society. The next year, on 3 December, Mielck experienced the greatest moment of his career when the Berlin Philharmonic, one of the world's most acclaimed orchestras, played his symphony. This success, however, was short-lived, as Mielck died of consumption on 22 October 1899 while on medical leave in Locarno, Switzerland. As such, the F minor Symphony is his only contribution to the symphonic canon.

The symphony also retains a degree of historical significance as a catalyst for Jean Sibelius: the praise for Mielck doubled as an indictment of Sibelius's delay and motivated him to attempt a symphony of his own. This process resulted two years later in the Symphony No. 1 (Op. 39).

History

In 1894, Mielck graduated from the prestigious Stern Conservatory in Berlin. In 1895, on the advice of this teachers, he continued his schooling as a postgraduate student under the auspices of Max Bruch, who was then one of Germany's leading composers. Upon returning home to Viipuri (Vyborg) in 1896, Mielck began composing his symphony between concert appearances as a pianist, completing it in the autumn of 1897. According to the Finnish press, which advertised the Mielck symphony with the prefix "fairy tale", the young composer took inspiration from Hans Christian Andersen's Ice Maiden.

Notable performances
Mielck's symphony received its premiere on 20 October 1897 during a composition concert at the Ceremonial Hall of the Imperial Alexander's University of Finland, Robert Kajanus conducting the Helsinki Orchestral Society (which he had founded in 1882). The program also included Mielck's String Quintet in F major (Op. 3; 1897), for two violins, two violas, and cello (performed by Gregorowitsch, Kihlman, Sante, Röllig, and Fischer), as well as Grieg's Piano Concerto in A minor (1868), with Mielck serving as soloist.

Kajanus and crew repeated the symphony at the same venue four days later on the afternoon of 24 October; this time, no other compositions by Mielck were programmed, but he was nonetheless on hand to play solo piano pieces by other composers. However, when the orchestral parts failed to arrive in time, the orchestra was forced to substitute Mielck's Macbeth Overture (Op. 2; 1896) for the symphony. Also on the program was Grieg's Piano Concerto, with Mielck as soloist, and the String Quintet in F major (Novácèk, Dörner, Bröckl, Eiben, and Nast).

The Helsinki critics responded positively. 

After these performances, Mielck returned to Berlin to resume his studies under Bruch, who "was full of praise" upon seeing his pupil's latest compositions. He suggested some modifications, and Mielck set about revising the symphony in the autumn of 1898. A milestone arrived when on 3 December 1898 Mielck held a composition concert at the Berlin Singing Academy, with  conducting the Berlin Philharmonic in three of the young Finn's works: the F minor Symphony, the Dramatic Overture (Op. 6; 1898), and the Concert Piece in E minor for Piano and Orchestra (Op. 9; 1898), for which Mielck served as soloist.

Mielck's symphony was in the provisional program for Kajanus's Finnish music concert at the 1900 Paris Exposition, but was replaced by Sibelius's Symphony No. 1 (then known simply as the Symphony in E minor).

Structure

Recordings
The sortable table below lists all commercially available recordings of Mielck's Symphony in F minor:

Notes, references, and sources

Books

Liner notes
 
 

Newspaper articles (by date)

1897 compositions
Classical music in Finland
Compositions in F minor
Mielck